Lassi Thomson (born 24 September 2000) is a Finnish professional ice hockey defenseman who is currently playing with the Belleville Senators in the American Hockey League (AHL) as a prospect to the Ottawa Senators of the National Hockey League (NHL).

Playing career
He was drafted 19th overall by the Ottawa Senators in the first round of the 2019 NHL Entry Draft. On 15 July 2019, Thomson was signed to a three-year, entry-level contract with the Senators. 

Thomson was invited to the Senators training camp ahead of the  season. On 3 October 2021 he was assigned to the Senators American Hockey League (AHL) affiliate, the Belleville Senators. Thomson made his NHL debut on 12 November 2021 with the Senators in a 2–0 loss to the Los Angeles Kings after being recalled the same day from Belleville due to a breakout of COVID-19 in the team. He was returned to Belleville on 8 December 2021 after playing in eleven games. He was recalled for one game on 1 January 2022 against the Toronto Maple Leafs and then called up again on 25 January 2022. He finished the season playing in 16 games for the Senators.

Personal life
Thomson's father is Scottish.

Career statistics

Regular season and playoffs

International

Awards and honours

References

External links
 

2000 births
Living people
Belleville Senators players
Finnish ice hockey defencemen
Finnish people of Scottish descent
Ilves players
Kelowna Rockets players
National Hockey League first-round draft picks
Ottawa Senators draft picks
Ottawa Senators players
Ice hockey people from Tampere